Hollands may refer to:

People with the surname Hollands:

 Fred Hollands (1870–1948), English footballer
 Danny Hollands (born 1985), English footballer
 Lotte Hollands, Dutch mathematical physicist
 Mario Hollands (born 1988), American baseball player
 Mike Hollands (born 1946), Australian animator and film director

Other uses 
 Holland gin or Jenever, a juniper-flavored liquor
 Holland's Pies, A manufacturer of pies and puddings based in Baxenden, near Accrington in Lancashire, England
 Holland's Magazine, a magazine published from 1876 to 1953